John F. Berner (died March 10, 1996) was Commissioner of the St. Louis Metropolitan Police Department from 1982 to 1985.

References

1996 deaths
Commissioners of the St. Louis Metropolitan Police Department